"Ballin" is a song by American rapper Young Jeezy from the deluxe edition of his fourth studio album, Thug Motivation 103: Hustlerz Ambition. It features rapper Lil Wayne and peaked at number 57 on the Billboard Hot 100 and number 15 on the Hot R&B/Hip-Hop Songs chart.

Music video 
The music video for "Ballin was directed by Colin Tilley, and was released on July 10, 2011.

Remixes
An unofficial remix of "Ballin features Houston rapper Trae tha Truth in May 2011.

Charts

Weekly charts

Year-end charts

Release history

References

2011 singles
2011 songs
Def Jam Recordings singles
Lil Wayne songs
Music videos directed by Colin Tilley
Songs written by Jeezy
Songs written by Lil Wayne
Jeezy songs